Nyatsime College in Harara Province, Zimbabwe is the country's first technical college specifically for African students. It opened in 1962, as the brainchild of educator and activist Stanlake J. W. T. Samkange, in what was then Southern Rhodesia. At the time no such school for African students existed, and Samkange had started fundraising for the school in 1951 already.

The school, designed to be run by African administrators and faculty for African students, was modelled on Tuskegee University in Alabama, USA; the opening dedication was attended by Luther H. Foster Jr., then Tuskegee's president.

Controversy
In Nov 2019, Cops investigated reports of sexual abuse cases filed by the students against the college staff.

Notable people
Samuel Chimsoro
Julius Chingono

References

Harare Province
Schools in Zimbabwe